Sulaqan and Suleqan and Sulqan may refer to:
 Suleqan, Hormozgan
 Sulaqan, Qom
 Sulqan Rural District, in Tehran Province